is a Japanese sabre fencer. Nakayama is also a member of the fencing team for Ogaki Kyoritsu Bank Sporting Club in Gifu, and is coached and trained by two-time Olympian Volodymyr Lukashenko of Ukraine.

Nakayama represented Japan at the 2012 Summer Olympics in London, where she competed in the women's individual sabre event. She defeated France's Léonore Perrus in the first preliminary round, before losing her next match to U.S. fencer and two-time Olympic champion Mariel Zagunis, with a final score of 9–15.

References

External links
Profile – FIE
NBC Olympics Profile

1983 births
Living people
Japanese female sabre fencers
Olympic fencers of Japan
People from Kōnan, Aichi
Fencers at the 2012 Summer Olympics
Sportspeople from Aichi Prefecture
Fencers at the 2010 Asian Games
Asian Games competitors for Japan
20th-century Japanese women
21st-century Japanese women